The Wells Vertige is a British mid-engine, rear-wheel drive two-seater sports car by Wells Motor Cars.

History 
The car was created by Robin Wells who conceived the idea in 2014. The reason behind the idea was because no other sports car appealed to him, thus decided to make one himself. It made it public debut at the 2021 Goodwood Festival of Speed. The launch helped Wells Motor Cars form a partnership with Hall Engineering and Design which is based in Northamptonshire with Robin Hall as CEO. The Vertige is built on a steel monocoque chassis with composite body and tubular steel roll-cage. It is equipped with front and rear aluminium double-wishbone suspensions as well as butterfly doors.

Production is planned to run in batches, with 25 cars produced per year over at a new factory in  Bishop's Itchington, Warwickshire, with price starting at around £40,000. The first batch of 7 cars were built by Hall Engineering and sold to close relatives and friends.

Gallery

Prototype 001

Production version

References

External links
 

2020s cars
Cars of England
Rear mid-engine, rear-wheel-drive vehicles
Sports cars
Cars powered by transverse 4-cylinder engines